African and Black Diaspora is a biannual peer-reviewed academic journal covering African and Black studies, as well as research on the African diaspora. It was established in 2008 and is published by Routledge. The editors-in-chief are Fassil Demissie (DePaul University) and Sandra Jackson (DePaul University).

The first academic journal to address directly the needs of scholars working in the field of African Diaspora studies, it publishes research articles, commentaries and book reviews.

Abstracting and indexing
The journal is abstracted and indexed in Scopus.

Special issues
The journal has produced special issues, sometimes guest-edited, that have subsequently been published as books by Routledge.

References

External links

African studies journals
Publications established in 2008
Routledge academic journals
Biannual journals
English-language journals